In sports car racing, balance of performance (BoP) is a regulation and mechanism that maintains parity between competing vehicles by adjusting limits on a car's parameters, such as  horsepower, weight, engine management, and aerodynamics to prevent a single manufacturer from becoming dominant in a racing class or series.

History 

The origin of the term "balance of performance" dates back to the creation of Group GT3 in 2005 for the 2006 racing season, using experience learned from homologation special phenomenon in previous GT classes, although other series such as British Touring Car Championship and Japanese Super GT series had applied different concept in the past (and still in effect today) called success ballast, which only affected the weight of a competing car for each round in case of win or placement in previous events. (Deutsche Tourenwagen Masters also previously featured a success ballast system named as BoP between 2015 to 2017 until it was scrapped with two races left in the 2017 season). The aim of the system is to allow development of various racing models within a class, without leading to expensive development wars between manufacturers. The system was later adopted for other production-based racing classes such as Group GT4, LM GTE and TCR Touring Cars. Although one-make, open-wheel and prototype car racing typically do not use a BoP system, a similar system was devised for LMP1 class in FIA World Endurance Championship called equivalence of technology (abbreviated EoT), that allows for parity between hybrid and non-hybrid cars in the class. Additionally, DPi cars in the IMSA WeatherTech SportsCar Championship are subject to balance of performance as well.

Mechanism 

Balance of performance is assigned by testing and analysis of a certain model's performance through previous races, although alternate methods may be used if the competing vehicle is new. For example, for GT3 cars, SRO holds two BoP tests a year at Circuit Paul Ricard, with cars driven by professional racing drivers who would have driven the car, to assess the performance of, and thus assign the BoP, of each car. These cars are equipped with an organizer-supplied telemetry device so that the organizer can gather data to allow the balancing of the cars, with new-to-class cars also subject to wind tunnel and dynometer testing. Once the results are obtained, various aspects of the car that can affect the car's performance such as engine horsepower, vehicle weight, aerodynamics, are then adjusted. By analyzing performance patterns of each car, organizers can change BoP of a car at any point during the season. Different series or organizers may calculate BoP differently depending on the conditions, with IMSA and ACO applying different BoP calculation for LM GTE cars in their respective series, while BoP for GT3 cars participating in Super GT's GT300 class are optimized to allow competition against cars built exclusively for the series, and TCR has a unique feature called compensation weight, as a further mechanism to balance the cars.

Some manufacturers have been accused of sandbagging, where a car would purposely underperform during a test, or during certain races, to receive favorable results later; for example, rival teams accused the Ford GT (run by Chip Ganassi Racing) of sandbagging during the 2016 FIA World Endurance Championship season, even after performance adjustments after the qualifying for 2016 24 Hours of Le Mans. Various rules have been made to deter this; for example, IMSA mandated any car that is found to be sandbagging during the Roar Before the 24 (a testing session leading to the 24 Hours of Daytona race) at their discretion to serve a five-minute stop and go penalty starting from 2014 season if a team is caught sandbagging during the sessions (penalties are served differently if the sandbagging was discovered after the end of the sessions), although instances of sandbagging were still found as of 2019 race.

Several racing games, such as Gran Turismo Sport, Gran Turismo 7, RaceRoom and Assetto Corsa Competizione, also features a simulated balance of performance for each playable car as part of the games' game balance mechanism.

References 

Motorsport terminology